Hestand Stadium is a 7,000-seat covered open-air stadium located in Pine Bluff, Arkansas.  It is the site of the annual Southeast Arkansas District Fair and Rodeo.  The stadium contains  of field space.  It is used for other outdoor events.

It is the flagship facility of the Southeast Arkansas District fairgrounds, which also include five exhibit halls totaling  and four barns totalling  of space.  It is also used for concerts, ice shows, circuses and other events.

External links
Hestand Stadium

Rodeo venues in the United States
Sports venues in Arkansas
Indoor arenas in Arkansas
Buildings and structures in Pine Bluff, Arkansas
Tourist attractions in Jefferson County, Arkansas
Sports in Pine Bluff, Arkansas